Diego Aguilar may refer to:

 Diego de Aguilar ( 1597), Spanish painter
 Diego de Aguilar (bishop) (1616–1692), Spanish Roman Catholic prelate
 Diego Aguilar Acuña (born 1946), Mexican politician
 Diego Aguilar (footballer) (born 1997), Mexican footballer